Melanie Leupolz (born 14 April 1994) is a German professional footballer who plays as a midfielder for Women's Super League club Chelsea and the Germany national team.

Club career
Leupolz started her career with TSV Ratzenried and TSV Tettnang, then she joined Freiburg in 2010. In 2010–11 season, Freiburg was promoted to Bundesliga. In the following season, she made her Bundesliga debut on 21 August 2011 and scored a goal in a 2–2 away draw against SC 07 Bad Neuenahr.

In 2014, she joined Bayern Munich. She made her debut on 31 August 2014 for Bayern in a 1–1 draw against 1. FFC Frankfurt, then she scored her first goal in a 4–0 win over Bayer 04 Leverkusen on 2 October 2014. Later on, she managed to win two Bundesliga titles in her first two seasons with Bayern, in 2014–15 and 2015–16. In 2018, she extended her contract until 2020.

On 23 March 2020, Leupolz signed for Chelsea. On 29 August 2020, she won the FA Community Shield, to be her first title with Chelsea. On 13 September, she scored her first goal for Chelsea in a 9–0 win over Bristol City. On 7 March 2022, Chelsea FC announced that she was pregnant, pledged the support of the club's medical team and said she would play no further part in the 2021–22 season.

International career
As an Under-17 international she competed at the 2010 U-17 World Cup, where she scored two goals against South Africa. She was the team's captain in the 2011 U-17 European Championship, where she missed the final shot in the penalty shootout in the semifinals against France.

On 19 June 2013 Leupolz made her senior Germany debut in a 1–0 win over Canada in Paderborn. The following day she was named in the Germans' UEFA Women's Euro 2013 squad.

She was part of the squad for the 2016 Summer Olympics, where Germany won the gold medal.

At the 2019 Women's World Cup, she scored a goal in Germany's 4–0 win over South Africa, her first national goal since the 2016 Summer Olympics.

Career statistics

Club

International 

Scores and results list Germany's goal tally first, score column indicates score after each Leupolz goal.

Honours
Bayern Munich
Bundesliga: 2014–15, 2015–16

Chelsea
 FA Women's Super League: 2020–21,  2021-22
 FA Women's League Cup: 2020–21
 FA Community Shield: 2020
 FA Women's Cup: 2020-21, 2021-22

Germany U-20
FIFA U-20 Women's World Cup: 2012 runner-up

Germany
Summer Olympics: 2016
UEFA Women's Championship: 2013
Algarve Cup: 2014

References

External links

 
Profile at DFB 
 Player German domestic football stats at DFB 
 
 
 
 
 

1994 births
Living people
German women's footballers
Germany women's international footballers
FC Bayern Munich (women) players
SC Freiburg (women) players
2015 FIFA Women's World Cup players
People from Wangen im Allgäu
Sportspeople from Tübingen (region)
Women's association football midfielders
Footballers at the 2016 Summer Olympics
Olympic medalists in football
Olympic gold medalists for Germany
Medalists at the 2016 Summer Olympics
Frauen-Bundesliga players
Olympic footballers of Germany
UEFA Women's Championship-winning players
Footballers from Baden-Württemberg
2019 FIFA Women's World Cup players
Women's Super League players
German expatriate women's footballers
Chelsea F.C. Women players
German expatriate sportspeople in England